Anton Ludwig Ernst Horn (24 August 1774 – 27 September 1848) was a German physician who was a native of Braunschweig.

In 1797 he received his doctorate from the University of Göttingen, and later worked as a physician at the clinical institute in Braunschweig. For a short period of time he was a professor of medicine at the Universities of Wittenberg (1804) and Erlangen (1805), and in 1806 went to work at the medical hospital at the Charité in Berlin. One of his well-known students was Moritz Heinrich Romberg (1795–1873).

Horn is considered the first practicing psychiatrist at the Charité. In the early 19th century, psychology as a scientific discipline was in its infancy, and barbaric, coercive methods were generally used to treat mental patients. Horn believed that mental illness was largely due to physical suffering, and used an assortment of mechanical devices for therapeutic purposes. He extensively used centrifugal devices such as the "rotating bed" and "rotating chair" for treatment of hysteria at the Charité, and reportedly believed that his patients derived benefits from such practices.

In 1803 Horn published a practical textbook on pharmaceuticals titled Handbuch der praktischen Arzneimittellehre für Ärzte und Wundärzte. He is also credited for providing an early description of tabes dorsalis.

References 
 This article incorporates translated text from an equivalent article at the German Wikipedia, whose sources include: ADB:Horn, Ernst In: Allgemeine Deutsche Biographie (ADB). Band 13, Duncker & Humblot, Leipzig 1881, S. 135 f.

External links 
 Centrifuge “Therapy” for Psychiatric Patients in Germany in the Early 1800s
  NCBI; Venery, the spinal cord, and tabes dorsalis before Romberg: the contribution of Ernst Horn

German psychiatrists
1774 births
1848 deaths
Physicians from Braunschweig
People from the Duchy of Brunswick
Academic staff of the University of Erlangen-Nuremberg
Academic staff of the University of Wittenberg
Physicians of the Charité